is the pen name of a Japanese manga artist from Fukuoka, Japan.  He is best known as the creator of Sketchbook which was adapted into a 13 episode anime television series by the studio Hal Film Maker and broadcast on TV Tokyo.

Works
 (2002-ongoing, serialized in Comic Blade, Mag Garden)
 (2007, Mag Garden)

References

External links

Year of birth missing (living people)
Living people
Manga artists from Fukuoka Prefecture
People from Fukuoka